Faith is the fourth studio album by Belgian hardcore punk band Rise and Fall. It was released on March 20, 2012 in the United States through Deathwish Inc. A music video for the song "Hidden Hands" was released in February 2012.

Track listing
 "A Hammer and Nails" – 1:14
 "Deceiver" – 2:00
 "The Gallows Await" – 1:50
 "Burning at Both Ends" – 2:24
 "Things Are Different Now" – 4:26
 "Breathe" – 3:50
 "Hidden Hands" – 1:40
 "Escapism" – 1:49
 "Dead Weight" – 1:59
 "Faith / Fate" – 6:46

References

External links
Faith at jacobbannon.com – All four cover art variations by Jacob Bannon

2012 albums
Rise and Fall (band) albums
Deathwish Inc. albums
Albums produced by Kurt Ballou
Albums with cover art by Jacob Bannon